Ashrafuddin Ahmad Chowdhury (1894 – 25 March 1976) was a Bengali politician who had served as general secretary of the Congress Party's Bengal branch, member of the East Bengal Legislative Assembly and later as the Education Minister of Pakistan. He was an advocate of Huseyn Shaheed Suhrawardy's United Bengal proposal.

Early life
Chowdhury was born in 1894, into a well-reputed Bengali Muslim family of zamindars in Batagram, Tipperah District, Bengal Presidency (now Comilla District, Bangladesh). He was a son of Tofazzal Ahmad Chowdhury, alias Anu Mia, an influential zamindar of that time. Chowdhury moved to Calcutta for his education, where he studied at the Hare School and then at the St. Xavier's Collegiate School. He completed his bachelor's degree from the Rajshahi College in North Bengal, and then completed law school at the Calcutta University in 1919.

Career
Chowdhury was a prominent leader in the anti-British Indian independence movement. He was involved in the Khilafat Movement and Non-cooperation Movement as an activist and the leader of the All India National Congress's Bengal branch. He became a leader of the Tippera Krishak Samiti's moderate side. From 1937 to 1941, he was the general secretary of the Bengal Provincial Congress Committee during the presidency of Subhash Chandra Bose. He was one of the closest allies of Bose and played an instrumental role in organising Bengal Congress at that time. Chowdhury also played a vital role in formation of Forward Bloc with Bose and was a vital member in the founding Working Committee of All India Forward Bloc, which was the party's highest forum for whole India. He supported Indian nationalism and Hindu-Muslim unity. He was also the first non-British chairman of the District Board of Tipperah (Comilla) and was a member of the Bengal Legislative Assembly. During 1921- 1947, he served several terms of imprisonment as a political prisoner, opposing the British Raj.

In the 1940s he joined the Nikhil Banga Jamiat-i-Ulama-i-Hind. Chowdhury stood as a candidate of the Nizam-e-Islam Party as part of the United Front alliance during the 1954 East Bengal Legislative Assembly elections, in which he gained a seat in his home constituency of Comilla. In 1954, he became the Minister of Education during the cabinet of A. K. Fazlul Huq, he became Education Minister again during the cabinet of Abu Hussain Sarkar.

Death and legacy
Chowdhury died on 25 March 1976 in Bangladesh. He left behind his wife, Razia Khatun Chowdhurani, a poet and litterateur, and their daughter Rabeya Chowdhury, a prominent politician of the Bangladesh Nationalist Party.

References

1894 births
1976 deaths
People from Comilla District
Rajshahi College alumni
University of Calcutta alumni
20th-century Bengalis
People of East Pakistan
Hare School alumni
Education Ministers of Pakistan